Fiona Hutchison (born 17 May 1960) is an American actress. She is known for her roles on the American soap operas One Life to Live and Guiding Light.

Personal life
Hutchison was born in Miami, Florida, to British parents. She grew up in South Miami, Florida, Jamaica, and Columbia, South Carolina and has two older brothers.

Hutchison is trained in ballet and classical dance, attending the Miami Conservatory as a child. She accelerated her high school studies and left to study at the School of American Ballet when she was 15; later, she earned her bachelor's degree from Clemson University.

Hutchison married assistant director Sean Dromgoole in 1987 but they would divorce in 1992. She married actor John Viscardi on 16 September 1994. They have two sons, Hutch (born 3 September 1996) and Trevor Westcott (born March 1998).

Career
In 1985, Hutchison appeared on Guiding Light as Tanya, but is best known for her roles as Gabrielle Medina on One Life to Live (1987–1991, 2001–2004) and as Jenna Bradshaw on Guiding Light (1992–1994, 1996–1998). She later appeared for a brief stint as Celia Frasier on As the World Turns in 2000. In 2006, Hutchison made a one-day return to Guiding Light for a special Mother's Day episode and returned again in 2009 for several episodes, as many former stars returned for the show's final episodes. Hutchinson returned to One Life to Life as her deceased character, Gabrielle, on 9 January 2012.

References

External links
Fiona Hutchison profile @ soapcentral.com

British soap opera actresses
American soap opera actresses
Clemson University alumni
Actresses from Miami
1960 births
Living people
American television actresses
21st-century American women